Central Magnet School is a public magnet school located in Murfreesboro, Tennessee. The school is a part of the Rutherford County school system and serves students from grades 6 through 12. It is known for its academic rigor and numerous awards. In 2020, Central received the National Blue Ribbon School recognition for academic achievement.

History 

In the 1900s, Central Magnet was originally Central High School. The high school campus burned down in 1944 and was later rebuilt in 1950 to replace the Tennessee College for Women. Due to the large enrollment of students at Central High School, Rutherford County established Riverdale High School and Oakland High School, and Central then became a middle school. In the fall of 2010, Central became an academic magnet school.

Academics 
Central Magnet School is an academic magnet school, offering five dual enrollment options, 31 Advanced Placement courses, and 68 honors–or above honors–level courses. 100 percent of students participate in the AP program. 

High school students must take four Advanced Placement courses, complete 25 hours of community service for each year of enrollment, and present a senior thesis in order to be eligible for the "Central Magnet Diploma".

Clubs 

 4-H Club
 Architecture, Construction and Engineering Club
 Art Club
 Aviation Club
 Beta Club
 Black Student Union
 Book Club
 Cake Decorating Club
 Car Club
 Central Chronicle
 Central Entrepreneurship Organization
 Chess Program
 Spanish Club
 Central Outdoors and Recreational Education Club
 Creative Writing Club
 Culinary Club
 DECA
 Design Club
 Digital Art & Animation Club
 Fellowship of Christian Athletes
 First Priority
 FIRST Robotics
 Fitness Club
 French Club
 Gardening Club
 German Club
 GIS Club
 Gender Sexuality Alliance
 HOSA
 Improv Club
 Interact Club
 International Thespian Society Troupe
 Jr. Beta Club
 Key Club
 Kickball Club
 French Round Table
 Linguistics Club
 Medical Research Club
 Mentor Club
 Mock Trial
 Movie Circle
 Mu Alpha Theta
 Music Through the Years
 Music Writers' Club
 Musical Theatre Club
 Mythology Club
 National English Honor Society
 National Honor Society
 National Junior Classical League
 National Spanish Honor Society
 National Technical Honor Society
 Natural Arts Club
 Neuroscience Club
 Newspaper Club
 No Sew Fleece Club
 Photography Club
 Poetry Club
 Prom Committee
 Psychology Club
 Radio Club
 Rho Kappa National Social Studies Honor Society
 Science National Honor Society
 Science Olympiad
 Shakespeare Club
 Society of Women Engineers
 Speech & Debate Club
 Student Council
 TableTop Board Gaming Club
 Tag Club
 The Central Review
 Tiger News Team
 Tri-M Music Honor Society
 Technology Student Association
 Ultimate Frisbee
 UNICEF
 Weightlifting Club
 Young Life
 Youth in Government

References

External links 
Central Magnet School
Rutherford County Schools

Public high schools in Tennessee
Magnet schools in Tennessee
Schools in Rutherford County, Tennessee
Murfreesboro, Tennessee